Johnny Kelley (1907–2004) was an American long-distance runner who won the Boston Marathon in 1935 and 1945, also known as "Kelley the Elder"

Johnny Kelley or Kelly may also refer to:
John J. Kelley (1930–2011), American long-distance runner who won the 1957 Boston Marathon, also known as "Kelley the Younger"
Johnny Kelly (born 1968), American drummer

See also
John Kelley (disambiguation)
John Kelly (disambiguation)